The Prosecutor General of the Republic is the head of the Brazilian Federal Prosecution Office, an autonomous agency in charge of criminal prosecution and the defense of society in general. The Prosecutor General heads a group of independent prosecutors, who work to investigate and prosecute criminal, labor, and civil offenses committed against society. It is a position appointed by the President of the Republic and the nomination must be approved by the Federal Senate.

Augusto Aras has been the Prosecutor General of Brazil since 26 September 2019.

List of Prosecutors General
 José Júlio de Albuquerque Barros (1891-1893)
 Ovídio Fernandes Trigo de Loureiro (1894)
 Antônio de Sousa Martins (1894-1896)
 Lúcio de Mendonça (1897)
 Joaquim Antunes de Figueiredo Júnior (1897)
 João Pedro Belfort Vieira
 Antônio Augusto Ribeiro de Almeida
 Epitácio da Silva Pessoa (1902-1905)
 Pedro Antônio de Oliveira Ribeiro
 Joaquim Xavier Guimarães Natal
 Antônio Augusto Cardoso de Castro
 Edmundo Muniz Barreto
 Antônio Joaquim Pires de Carvalho e Albuquerque
 Antônio Bento de Faria
 Carlos Maximiliano Pereira dos Santos
 Gabriel de Resende Passos (1936-1945)
 Hahnemann Guimarães
 Themístocles Brandão Cavalcanti
 Luís D'Assunção Gallotti
 Plínio de Freitas Travassos
 Carlos Medeiros Silva
 Cândido de Oliveira Neto
 Joaquim Canuto Mendes de Almeida
 Evandro Cavalcanti Lins e Silva
 Cândido de Oliveira Neto (1963-1964)
 Oswaldo Trigueiro de Albuquerque Mello (1964-1965)
 Alcino Salazar (1965-1967)
 Haroldo Teixeira Valladão (1967)
 Décio Meirelles de Miranda (1967-1969)
 Francisco Manuel Xavier de Albuquerque (1969-1972)
 José Carlos Moreira Alves (1972-1975)
 Henrique Fonseca de Araújo (1975-1979)
 Firmino Ferreira Paz (1979-1981)
 Inocêncio Mártires Coelho (1981-1985)
 Sepúlveda Pertence (1985-1989)
 Aristides Junqueira (June 1989 – 1995)
 Geraldo Brindeiro (June 1995-June 2003)
 Claudio Fonteles (June 2003-June 2005)
 Antonio Fernado de Souza (June 2005-July 2009)
 Roberto Gurgel (July 2009-September 2013)
 Rodrigo Janot (September 2013-September 2017)
 Raquel Dodge (September 2017-September 2019)
 Augusto Aras (26 September 2019 – present)

See also
 Brazilian Public Prosecutor's Office
 Attorney General of Brazil
 Brazilian Ministry of Justice
 Brazilian Public Defender's Office

References

External links
Official website of the Brazilian Prosecutor General's Office 

Brazilian criminal law
Government ministries of Brazil
General